Hanuman Junction  is a town which lies between the borders of Krishna and Eluru District of Andhra Pradesh state in India. Hanuman Junction gets its name because it is located in the X-Junction of NH-16 & AH-45. 

As a part of Bapulapadu Mandal, Gannavaram is the Assembly Constituency and Machilipatnam is the Lok Sabha Constituency.

History 

Legends  claim that the town was once ruled by Shri M.R. Apparao, a nomadic Zamindar. His father, Sri Meka Venkatadri Bahadur, came to the junction of Bahadur Hanuman with a tremendous appetite in the year 1938. The area was filled with shrubs, thorns and bushes. Suddenly, a monkey came, put a banana in Zamindar's hand and disappeared. Believing that the god  Sri Anjaneya Swamy revealed himself as a monkey and handed him a banana, a statue of Sri Anjaneya Swamy in a state of devotion was chosen to be erected there. It was built later that year.

The idol was erected to protect religious devotees from the clutches of evil spirits and set up the Hanuman Junction, a four-lane junction.

Religious worship

Sri Abhaya Anjaneya Swamy Temple 

The statue of Swami was erected in 1938 on the border of Krishna district and West Godavari districts. The feet of the idol are on the border between the districts of West Godavari and  Krishna. The Sanctuary is in the West Godavari district but the stairs are in the Krishna district. The face of the statue of Anjaneya Swamy has more human features than a monkey's. It draws crowds from the neighboring cities of Hyderabad, Vizag, Gudivada,   Vijayawada, Tirupathi, Srisailam, Karimnagar, Nellore, Warangal, Basara, and Kadapa.

Sitha Rama Dasanjaneya Swami Temple 
Late Sri Palnati Satyanarayana Garu established the Sita Rama Dasanjaneya swami temple in Epuru, Hanuman Junction. Adjacent to that temple there exists a Hanuman statue, 45 feet tall, which was erected in the year 2015. It is the tallest statue of Hanuman in Hanuman Junction. It is located in the village of Epuru, approximately 1.5&nbs km from Hanuman Junction. Epuru Dasanjaneeya Swamy Temple is a statue depicting Abhaya Anjaneeya Swamy. This statue was inaugurated on 23 February 2015 which stands 45 feet tall.

Public transport

Hanuman Junction lies on the Eluru – Vijayawada section of AH-45. APSRTC runs bus services from Eluru, Vijayawada, and Rajahmundry. Regular bus facility from Eluru, Vijayawada, Gudivada, Machilipatnam and Nuzvid.
 
The Nuzvid railway station is just 2 kilometers away from the town.

Frequently running auto rickshaws, taxis and buses are available.

City bus route numbers between Hanuman Junction and Vijayawada are 252S, 252B, 252.

Education 
Primary and secondary school education is provided by the government, aided by private schools, under the School Education Department of the state. The languages used in instruction by different schools are English and Telugu.

Healthcare

Seetha Maha Lakshmi Nursing Home - maintained by DR.Dutta Rama Chandra Rao Garu for many years giving great medicine and treatment. It has been recently developed and reconstruction work has been done during early months of 2019.

AIMS in Nuzvid road and Andhra Hospitals in Eluru road, are also located in Hanuman Junction.

However, the town is far from any well-equipped hospitals for major operations.

Business 

Hanuman Junction is a business center for the local villages, and has experienced rapid growth throughout the past few years.

Here we can restaurants and street foods, sweet shops, and the food style is being developed and new restaurants, food cultures have been introduced to town.

Clothing shops, grocery stores, beauty parlors, saloons and more are upcoming.     

There are 2 movie theaters: Sri Krishna, which is located beside the bus stop, and KS Talkies, which is located near Seetha Maha Lakshmi Nursing Home hospital.

See also 
List of tallest statues

References

External links 

Towns in Krishna district